Chandan Madan (born 15 October 1982) is an Indian cricketer. He played as a wicket-keeper for Punjab cricket team, India U-19 cricket team, North Zone cricket team, Mumbai Indians and Kochi Tuskers Kerala. He was born in Amritsar.

References

External links
 

1982 births
Indian cricketers
Punjab, India cricketers
Mumbai Indians cricketers
North Zone cricketers
Kochi Tuskers Kerala cricketers
Living people
Wicket-keepers